The Masonic Temple Theater (subsequently the Temple Twin Theaters, and in 2013 the Main Street Cinemas) is a historic building located in Mount Pleasant, Iowa, United States. Built in 1923, it combined both commercial and fraternal functions in one building. The theater company paid for the construction of the lower level, and the Masons paid for the upper level.  The Masons continued to occupy the space until 1989 when they moved to another facility. The building was designed in the Neoclassical style by Owen, Payson & Carswell, and K.A. Bergdahl was the contractor who built it.  Neoclassical features include the balustrade, the medallion with the Masonic insignia, volutes above the windows,  the parapet roof, and the ornamental frieze and cornice.

The building was listed on the National Register of Historic Places in 1991.

References

Masonic buildings completed in 1923
Former Masonic buildings in Iowa
Neoclassical architecture in Iowa
Buildings and structures in Mount Pleasant, Iowa
Clubhouses on the National Register of Historic Places in Iowa
Theatres on the National Register of Historic Places in Iowa
National Register of Historic Places in Henry County, Iowa